Mnesarete is a genus of damselflies in the family Calopterygidae.

There are about 27 species. All are limited to South America.

Species include:

Mnesarete aenea 
Mnesarete astrape 
Mnesarete borchgravii 
Mnesarete cupraea 
Mnesarete devillei 
Mnesarete drepane 
Mnesarete ephippium 
Mnesarete fulgida 
Mnesarete fuscibasis 
Mnesarete grisea 
Mnesarete guttifera 
Mnesarete hauxwelli 
Mnesarete hyalina 
Mnesarete lencionii 
Mnesarete loutoni 
Mnesarete machadoi 
Mnesarete marginata 
Mnesarete mariana 
Mnesarete metallica 
Mnesarete pruinosa 
Mnesarete pudica 
Mnesarete rhopalon 
Mnesarete smaragdina 
Mnesarete williamsoni

References

External links

Calopterygidae
Zygoptera genera
Odonata of South America
Taxa named by John Cowley (entomologist)